Antona suapurensis is a moth of the subfamily Arctiinae. It is found in Venezuela.

References

Lithosiini
Moths described in 1912
Moths of South America